Maculewicz is a Polish surname. Notable people with the surname include:

 Cyprian Maculewicz (1830–1906), Polish-Lithuanian architect and painter
 Henryk Maculewicz (born 1950), Polish football player
 Jerzy Maculewicz (born 1955), Roman Catholic prelate of the Polish descent
 Kinga Maculewicz-De La Fuente (born 1978), French volleyball player of the Polish descent

Polish-language surnames